Vishweshwarayya Polytechnic, is located at Almala in Ausa Tehsil in Latur district of Maharashtra state. The college was founded in 2008. Tel 225600. code 2383

Founded President:
Mr. Dharashive Shivcharan L.,
Vice President:
Prabhu Kapse
Location:	
At Almala Tq Ausa Dist Latur, Latur, India 413556

About
Vishweshwarayya Polytechnic College is the best, leading and topper college in Aurangabad region in Maharashtra state under the Affiliation of Maharashtra State Board of Technical Education Mumbai. Vishweshwarayya Polytechnic College was established in academic year 2008 under the guidance of Shri Shivcharan L Dharashive, President Shri Vishweshwar Shikshan Prasarak Mandal Almala.

College is Approved by:
 All India Council For Technical Education
 Government Of Maharashtra
 Directorate Of Technical Education Mumbai, Maharashtra State
 Maharashtra State Board Of Technical Education Mumbai, Maharashtra State.

College Codes:
DTE Code (Director of Technical Education)-- 2189
MSBTE Code ( Maharashtra State Board Of Technical Education)-- 1095

Mission
The mission of college is to spread the technical education throughout the country and increase the importance of technical education in rural and urban area. To make Vishweshwarayya Polytechnic to a top polytechnic college in Maharashtra. also to bring college on top of the list of polytechnic colleges in Maharashtra and India.

Academics
College runs five leading courses:
 Civil Engineering (CE)---218919110
 Computer Technology [CM]---218925110
 Electrical Engineering [EE]---218929310
 Electronics Engineering (Industry Integrated) [EI]---218937610
 Electronics & Telecommunication Engineering [EJ]---218937210

The polytechnic diploma certificates will be awarded to the students who are declared pass in final semester of their diploma course.

Universities and colleges in Maharashtra
Polytechnics in Latur
Educational institutions established in 2008
2008 establishments in Maharashtra